Cyrtodactylus vedda is a species of gecko that is endemic to Sri Lanka.

References 

Cyrtodactylus
Reptiles described in 2022